Joachim de Knagenhielm (1727–1796) was a Norwegian civil servant and politician from the noble Knagenhjelm family.  He served as the first County Governor of Nordre Bergenhus county from 1763 until 1771.  He was then appointed as the County Governor of Nordland county from 1771 until his retirement in 1789.

References

1727 births
1796 deaths
County governors of Norway
County governors of Nordland